Ida Pedanda Gede Made Gunung (31 December 1952 – 18 May 2016) was a Hindu high priest in Bali, Indonesia. He is assessed by many people to have far ahead approach, skilled in "translating" the philosophy of Hinduism with a clear and straightforward language and sense of humor.

Early life and background
Ida Pedanda Gede Made Gunung was born in Gria Gede Purnawati Kemenuh, Blahbatuh, Gianyar, Bali, Indonesia. Not surprisingly, Ida Pedanda Gede Made Gunung often appears in various media, both electronic and printed media, to give dharma talks (holy sermon) to the Hindu community of Bali and Indonesia as a whole. He gave dharma talks not only in Bali, but also outside of Jakarta, Bali and Kalimantan. He also had travelled on a holy journey to India with Dr. Somvir.

After completing Elementary School (1965) in Blahbatuh and Junior High School (1968) in Gianyar, he then continued his education to the State Teachers Top (1971) in Sukawati. He then worked as a Field Officer for Family Planning Gianyar (1972–1974), then became a primary school teacher in Ubud (1975–1983) and hereinafter moved to SD 7 Saba (1987–1994). In 1992 he was ranked as the ideal teacher and good example for Blahbatuh. On the sidelines of teaching, he continued his education at the Institute of Hindu Dharma (IHD) to obtain a Bachelor of Arts in 1986. He underwent the ceremony into Hindu Priesthood or became a Pedanda in 1994 and from 2002 until his death he has become ranked an extraordinary lecturer at Usada Faculty at Hindu University of Indonesia, called IHD now.

In addition, he was also active in organizations since the late 1960s. First in the field of sports, a volleyball player selected for PON, coached karate, and then joined the religious organizations. First, he was active in the Hindu Dharma Indonesia (PHDI) of Blahbatuh subdistrict, PHDI Gianyar (1989–1994) PHDI Bali (1994–2001) and the PHDI Bali local version (2001–2006)

Entering priesthood
Two years before entering priesthood, Ida Pedanda Gede Made Gunung began to reorganize patterns of thought, word and deed in preparation for entering priesthood. One day, about 4 months before the ceremony, he went to visit Sanglah Hospital to see how people were treated there, he wanted to feel the conditions and suffering of those who are sick, he also went to visit the ER, visit home ward to another until the end in front of the morgue. After that he visited the Hospital Wangaya for the same purpose. He also visited the Super Markets, just to see how the children played and enjoyed their morning meals. There he was followed by security guards, who felt a little awkward because they spotted this bearded, long-haired, headband-wearing man visiting place like that with no apparent purpose. After that he visited another supermarket that just opened. He did not visit any discos or other entertainment places as to visit such a place one must pay in advance. After that he went on a trip to the bird market, listening to the birds chirp and see the different types of pets that are sold there. Besides, he also helped to follow truck drivers who were driving his truck to send sand from Klungkung to other areas of Bali. He did it to know what it feels like to be a truck driver. After he had enough experiences, he began to develop programs to have a Tangkil (meeting) with the Sulinggih (priest) in Bali.

References

External links
Official site 

Indonesian Hindu religious leaders
Balinese people
Hindu priests
1952 births
20th-century Hindu religious leaders
21st-century Hindu religious leaders
2016 deaths